First Gentleman of Tanzania or First Lady of Tanzania is the unofficial title held by the husband or wife of the president of Tanzania. Until 19 March 2021, the office was held by women and thus referred to as First Lady. The country's present first gentleman is Hafidh Ameir.

Present and former Tanzanian first ladies are often affectionately called "Mama" within the country. In recent years, there has been public debate over the increasingly prominent role of the first ladies and gentlemen of Tanzania. There have been calls for Parliament to formalize the office of the First Lady and First Gentleman of Tanzania .

First ladies and gentlemen of Tanzania

References

Tanzania